Crofton Park is a station on the 'Catford Loop'  to Sevenoaks route, between Nunhead and Catford. It is in Travelcard Zone 3.

Facilities

The station has an automated ticket machine on the overbridge; the station ticket office is open Mon – Fri 0640–1320. In 2007 the ticket office was closed at weekends; however recently (mid-2008) the ticket office has been open on Saturdays. The Southeastern website in March 2014 advertised ticket office hours as Mon – Fri: 06:40 – 13:20/ Sat – Sun: closed.

New level access facilities were constructed to avoid the stairs to the platform (as of 2008). There is now step-free access to platform 1 (northbound) from Marnock Road, and step-free access to platform 2 (southbound) from Lindal Road. There is also step-free access to the ticket office on Brockley Road – although it is a few minutes walk from the step free access points.

Services 
Off-peak, all services at Crofton Park are operated by Thameslink using  EMUs.

The typical off-peak service in trains per hour is:

 2 tph to London Blackfriars
 2 tph to  via 

In addition, the service to London Blackfriars is extended to and from  via .

References

External links 

 for Crofton Park from National Rail
 of Crofton Park
 The Crofton Park Transport Users' Group

Railway stations in the London Borough of Lewisham
Former London, Chatham and Dover Railway stations
Railway stations in Great Britain opened in 1892
Railway stations served by Govia Thameslink Railway
Railway stations served by Southeastern